Chris is a unisex given name.

Chris may also refer to:

 Chris (album), a 2018 album by Christine and the Queens
 Chris (song), a 2011 song by C418 off the album Minecraft – Volume Alpha
 "Chris" (Skins series 1), a 2007 episode of the British television series Skins
 "Chris" (Skins series 2), a 2008 episode of the British television series Skins
 Chris (sheep) (2010–2019), a Merino ram shorn of a record amount of wool in 2015

See also

 
 Kris (name)
 Criss (name)
 Cris (disambiguation)
 Christopher (disambiguation)
 Christine (disambiguation)